Cerion geophilum (occasionally known as Cerion geophilus) is a species of terrestrial gastropod in the family Cerionidae, endemic to Morales Beach, Cuba.

Ecology and species-relationships 
Cerion geophilum is part of the distinct semi-square and flat-spired Cerion species clade (or complex) including C. disforme, alberti and torrei all of which are endemic to Holguin Province. This species naturally hybridizes with C. torrei moralesi in the western reaches of Morales Beach. Variation between various Cerion species within small areas of coastline is significant in comparison to that of other terrestrial gastropod groups- along a 50 kilometer stretch of coastline, seven distinct species and many hybrids are present. Several hybrid-swarm populations were interpreted by Ernst Mayr, representing contact zones between various scattered populations of different species and morphotypes.

References 

Cerionidae
Endemic fauna of Cuba
Gastropods described in 1949